Major-General Sir James Campbell (c. 1773–1835) was a Scottish army officer and colonial governor.

Early life
He was son of Major-General Dugald Campbell of Auchinleck (1742–1809) and his wife Elizabeth Mackay.

Campbell served from 1803 in the Second Anglo-Maratha War, under Arthur Wellesley.

Peninsular War
The 94th Regiment of Foot in which he served had its troops drafted into other regiments, and Campbell, promoted lieutenant-colonel in 1804, returned to the United Kingdom with the other officers. Stationed in Jersey, the 94th recruited again. It was sent to Portugal in 1810, and was on garrison duty in Lisbon and then Cadiz, Campbell commanding it in a brigade of the 3rd Division under Thomas Picton. From October 1810 it was under Charles Colville, in the field and at the battle of Fuentes de Oñoro in 1811.

From the end of 1811, Colville having taken over the 4th Division, Campbell commanded the 94th, to the end of the Peninsular War. He took command at the Siege of Badajoz (1812) of the 3rd Division, Picton and James Kempt being wounded. He was himself wounded, in command, at the Battle of Salamanca in 1812, and gave up brigade command to Colville in June 1813. He was then seriously wounded at the Battle of Vitoria, commanding the 94th, and returned to England.

Later life
Campbell was acting Governor of British Ceylon, appointed in 1822 and in post until 1824. He was succeeded by Edward Barnes. He was then Governor of Grenada, from 1826 to 1831.

Family
In 1817 Campbell married Lady Louisa Dorothea Cuffe, a younger daughter of Otway Cuffe, 1st Earl of Desart. Their fourth child, James Campbell (1822–1894), worked as an astronomer with Edmund Neville Nevill. Three daughters, Elizabeth Ann Louisa, Charlotte and Emily, survived their father.

References

1770s births
Year of birth uncertain
1835 deaths
Governors of British Ceylon
British expatriates in Sri Lanka
19th-century British people
General Officers Commanding, Ceylon
Governors of British Grenada